Sayu Bhojwani  was the first Commissioner of Immigrant Affairs of New York City. She also founded South Asian Youth Action, and the New American Leaders.

Career 
Bhojwani moved to New York City in 1987 as a student at Teachers College, Columbia University and obtained her Master's degree in education with an emphasis on teaching English with the intention of returning to Belize to teach. She declined to pursue a career in education when the New York City Department of Education would not help her obtain a green card. She instead took a job with Asia Society, immersing herself in issues pertaining to Asian Americans and realizing that policymakers did not look like the constituents she served.

As a resident of Queens, Bhojwani founded the afterschool South Asian Youth Action program in 1996 to support teenagers with ancestral origin from South Asia, which continues to serve New York today.

In 2001, Bhojwani re-enrolled at Teachers College for a doctorate in politics and education.

In April 2002, New York City Mayor Michael Bloomberg appointed her to the newly created role of Commissioner of Immigrant Affairs, where she expanded protections and services for the city's undocumented immigrants, domestic workers, and non-English speakers. She credits this role as demonstrating to her the power of a truly representative government, including having immigrants in positions of political influence to support immigrants. She served as Commissioner for two years, leaving the post in May 2004.

Bhojwani continued to work in philanthropy for Bloomberg, and moved to London for a time.

Bhojwani founded New American Leaders in 2010 after the United States Congress failed to create a path to citizenship for millions of undocumented immigrants and Arizona enacted Arizona SB 1070. She had considered running for office against Sheldon Silver, but decided to instead focus on building a diverse pipeline of local and state elected officials.

Bhojwani resumed her doctorate at Teachers College in 2014, writing her thesis on immigrants and electoral politics.

Personal life 
Bhojwani is a first generation immigrant to the United States. She was born in 1967 in India to Sindhi parents. Her family immigrated to Belize, then the British Honduras, when she was four.

She moved to the United States to study English and Spanish at the University of Miami in 1980. She has one child with her husband of 18 years.

Published works 

 Bhojwani, Sayu (2018). People Like Us: The New Wave of Candidates Knocking at Democracy's Door. The New Press.

References

External links 

 Sayu Bhojwani at TED (conference)

Living people
1967 births
American nonprofit executives
Indian emigrants to the United States
21st-century American women